First Baptist Church is a historic Baptist church at 813 Market Street in Parkersburg, Wood County, West Virginia.  It was built in 1871, and is a two-story, three by six-bay, brick church in the Italianate style, which was popular at the time.  It has a central steeple on the front facade and several rear additions.  It is topped by a gable roof trimmed by an arched corbel table and corner turret. This congregation was founded in 1817 and built their first church in 1837. First Baptist was built on that site.

It was listed on the National Register of Historic Places in 1982, and it is a contributing property to the Avery Street Historic District, which was designated and listed on the National Register in 1986.

References

Churches on the National Register of Historic Places in West Virginia
Baptist churches in West Virginia
Italianate architecture in West Virginia
Churches completed in 1871
19th-century Baptist churches in the United States
Churches in Wood County, West Virginia
Buildings and structures in Parkersburg, West Virginia
National Register of Historic Places in Wood County, West Virginia
Individually listed contributing properties to historic districts on the National Register in West Virginia
Italianate church buildings in the United States